Karl Gösta Herbert "Lövet" Löfgren (29 August 1923 – 5 September 2006) was a Swedish association football player who won a bronze medal at the 1952 Summer Olympics and a silver medal at the 1958 FIFA World Cup. Between 1951 and 1961, he played 40 international matches and scored 12 goals.

Gösta played for Motala AIF and took the team to Allsvenskan in 1957. In 1960, he began playing for IFK Norrköping and won the Swedish National Championship. He later coached IFK Norrköping.

References

External links

 http://wwwc.aftonbladet.se/sport/guldbollen/1955.html
 
 

1923 births
2006 deaths
Swedish footballers
Sweden international footballers
Footballers at the 1952 Summer Olympics
1958 FIFA World Cup players
Olympic bronze medalists for Sweden
Olympic footballers of Sweden
IFK Norrköping players
Swedish football managers
IFK Norrköping managers
Olympic medalists in football
Medalists at the 1952 Summer Olympics
Association football forwards
People from Motala Municipality
Footballers from Östergötland County